El Prat de Llobregat or El Prat Estació is both a Rodalies de Catalunya and a Barcelona Metro station serving the suburb of El Prat de Llobregat, to the south-west of Barcelona, in Catalonia, Spain. Some trains on regional line  also call at the station. The metro station is on the airport branch of Barcelona Metro line 9 (L9) and is operated by Transports Metropolitans de Barcelona (TMB).

References

External links
 El Prat de Llobregat  listing at the Rodalies de Catalunya website
 El Prat Estació listing at the Transports Metropolitans de Barcelona (TMB) website
 Information on the L9 Sud at the TMB website
 Information and photos of the Rodalies de Catalunya and Barcelona Metro stations at trenscat.cat 
 Video on train operations at the Rodalies de Catalunya station on YouTube

Railway stations in Spain opened in 2016
Madrid–Barcelona high-speed rail line
Barcelona Metro line 9 stations
Railway stations in El Prat de Llobregat
Rodalies de Catalunya stations
Railway stations in Spain opened in 1881
Railway stations in Spain opened in 2007
1881 establishments in Spain